Saint-Michel station is a Montreal Metro station in Montreal, Quebec, Canada. It is operated by the Société de transport de Montréal (STM) and is the eastern terminus of the Blue Line. It opened in 1986.

Overview  

It is a side platform station with two entrances on either side of boul. St-Michel connecting to a common ticket hall. Unlike all other stations on the Blue Line, the station is only as long as the six-car trains used on the line; all of the other stations were built to accommodate a nine-car train. However, the station cavern is long enough for a nine-car train; the extra space could be opened and finished to accommodate full-length trains when the STM extends the line east into the boroughs of St. Leonard and Anjou and to commit to the line's original design.

The platforms feature four abstract paintings under glass bricks, by Normand Moffat, Charles Lemay, Lauréat Marois, and Marcelin Cardinal.

Origin of name
Saint-Michel station takes its name from the street under which it lies, boulevard Saint-Michel, named since about the late eighteenth century for the former Ville Saint-Michel within which it is located. Saint-Michel is the French Catholic title for the archangel Michael.

Connecting bus routes

Nearby points of interest
 Little Maghreb
 Saint-Michel Library
 Centre administratif - Ville de Montréal
 Joseph-François-Perrault School
 John F Kennedy School
 François-Perrault Park

References

External links

Saint-Michel station on STM website
Montreal by Metro, metrodemontreal.com
 2011 STM System Map
 Metro Map

Blue Line (Montreal Metro)
Villeray–Saint-Michel–Parc-Extension
Railway stations in Canada opened in 1986